James Wade Bolton House is located in Alexandria, Louisiana.  It was added to the National Register of Historic Places in 1979;  the listing included three contributing buildings.

It is named for the late Alexandria banker James W. Bolton.

The property includes the Bolton House and two dependencies.  All are wood frame clapboarded structures built of long leaf yellow pine, and raised above the ground by brick piers. The main house has thirteen large rooms on one floor, and an unfinished attic.

References

Houses on the National Register of Historic Places in Louisiana
Houses completed in 1899
Houses in Alexandria, Louisiana
National Register of Historic Places in Rapides Parish, Louisiana